Cambodia participated at the 2021 Southeast Asian Games in Hanoi, Vietnam from 12 to 23 May 2022. The Cambodian contingent consisted of 361 athletes, competing in 33 out 40 sports.

Medal summary

Medal by sport

Medalists

Medal by date

Medalists

References 

Nations at the 2021 Southeast Asian Games
2021